Robert Cătălin Dascălu (born 13 April 1984 in Gura Humorului, Romania) is a Romanian rugby union player. He plays as a centre for amateur club CS Știința Petroșani.

Club career
For mostly of his career Dascălu played for Roamanian giants Steaua București. Dascălu also played for București based European Challenge Cup side the Wolves.

International career
Dascălu also plays for Romania's national team the Oaks. He made his international debut in 2006 in the centre position against Ukraine. He has represented Romania in  their 2007 Rugby World Cup qualifying before appearing for them in the 2007 Rugby World Cup.

References

External links

1984 births
Romanian rugby union players
Romania international rugby union players
Rugby union centres
CSA Steaua București (rugby union) players
Living people
People from Gura Humorului